USGS Peak, at  above sea level, is the tenth-highest peak in the U.S. state of Idaho and the eighth-highest in the Lost River Range. The peak is located in Salmon-Challis National Forest in Custer County.

References 

Mountains of Custer County, Idaho
Mountains of Idaho
Salmon-Challis National Forest